The 2016 Campeonato Ecuatoriano de Fútbol Serie A (officially known as the Copa Banco del Pacífico Serie A for sponsorship reasons) is the 58th season of the Serie A.

Teams
Twelve teams are competing in the 2016 Serie A season, ten of whom remain from the previous season. LDU Loja and Deportivo Quito were relegated from the Serie A after accumulating the fewest points during the 2015 season. They were replaced by Delfín and Fuerza Amarilla, the 2015 Serie B winner and runner-up, respectively. Delfín is making their 11th top-flight appearance and their first return to the Serie A since 2001, while Fuerza Amarilla is participating in their first top-flight appearance.

Stadia and locations 

Note: Table lists in alphabetical order.

Personnel and kits

First stage
The first stage began on February 5 and ended on July 24.

Results

Second stage
The second stage began on July 31 and ended on December 10.

Results

Third stage
As Barcelona won both the first stage and the second stage, the third stage was not played and Barcelona became champions automatically. Emelec became runners-up by virtue of the aggregate table.

Aggregate table

Top goalscorers

References

External links
Official website 

Ecuadorian Serie A seasons
Campeonato Ecuatoriano de Fútbol Serie A
Serie A